New York State Armory may refer to:
New York State Armory (Newburgh)
New York State Armory (Ogdensburg)
New York State Armory (Poughkeepsie)
New York State Armory (Kingston), now the Andy Murphy Midtown Neighborhood Center
New York State Armory (Ticonderoga)

See also
 List of armories and arsenals in New York City and surrounding counties
 :Category:Armories in New York City